Attorney General v Davy (1741) 26 ER 531 is a UK company law case, which establishes this small but essential point of law: the default rule is that a majority of a corporate body can determine what it does.

Equivalent rules in contemporary company law are s 168 Companies Act 2006, which allows shareholders to remove directors through a simple majority, Foss v Harbottle which presupposed that a majority of shareholders can always take action to litigate, and the rule in Automatic Self-Cleansing Filter Syndicate Co Ltd v Cuninghame, which raises the requirement to 75% of the shareholders if they are to give instructions to the board.

Facts
King Edward VI had incorporated twelve people by name in a charter to elect a chaplain for the church of Kirton, just outside Boston, Lincolnshire. A clause stated that three of the twelve would choose a chaplain for the Sandford church as well, another village within the Kirton parish, with the consent of the majority of Sandford residents. A late vacancy had been created. Two of the three chose a chaplain with the majority of residents' consent, but the third dissented. The question was whether the choice was valid.

Judgment
Lord Hardwicke LC held that the chaplain was validly elected, for a corporate body can act by a majority vote at any duly summoned meeting of members.

See also

United States corporate law
ICS v West Bromwich BS

Notes

Further reading
R v Varlo (1775) 1 Cowp 248

United Kingdom company case law
1741 in British law
Court of Chancery cases